Gran Hotel  is a Spanish drama television series created by Ramón Campos and Gema R. Neira which stars Yon González and Amaia Salamanca. It originally aired on Antena 3 from 2011 to 2013. It debuted on Sky Arts 1 in the UK in 2012.

It is set in an early 20th century aristocratic hotel during the reign of Alfonso XIII and is centered on the mysteries that involve the owner's family and the hotel servants.

Plot
The events take place in 1906–1907 in Spain, near a town called Cantaloa. The working-class Julio Olmedo arrives at the luxurious Grand Hotel to visit his sister Cristina, who works there as a maid and who has recently been promoted to floor manager. Julio is told by a waiter that Cristina was fired for theft a month before, a story Julio does not believe. He is convinced something happened to her at the hotel and there was a coverup. He takes a job there as a waiter under the name Julio Espinosa to investigate his sister's disappearance. He soon finds an ally in Alicia Alarcón, one of the daughters of the hotel's owner Doña Teresa. Alicia, who is being forced to marry hotel manager Diego Murquía, is also suspicious of things happening at the hotel. Together Julio and Alicia work to uncover the secrets of the Gran Hotel.

Season 1
Julio Olmedo arrives at the Gran Hotel to look for his sister Cristina. When he learns that she has been fired for theft and no one has any idea of her whereabouts, he joins the hotel as a waiter. Julio meets Alicia Alarcon, with whom he eventually falls in love. The couple, however, cannot be together as Alicia is engaged to Diego Murquia, the manager of the hotel. At the end of the season, Alicia marries Diego despite being in love with Julio.

Season 2
After Andrés is injured while changing the lightbulbs in the Gran Hotel's dining room, Julio decides to stay at the hotel because he suspects that his friend's accident might be a murder attempt. When Alicia returns from her honeymoon, Julio must regain her trust so that she'll help him in this new investigation. They discover more secrets related to the hotel's late owner, Carlos Alarcón, that could spell the end of the Gran Hotel.

Season 3
This season follows the same investigations as the previous season, but this time Alicia, Julio, and Andrés have the help of Detective Ayala, his assistant Hernando, and Alicia's best friend the lawyer Maite. They also discover new secrets about Diego Murquía involving an identity document and a new enemy who sets off an explosion in the Gran Hotel.

Cast

Episodes

Series overview 

In their original Spanish broadcast, episodes had a length of roughly 70 minutes each. For the international stream, Netflix recut all episodes to be 45 minutes of length and repackaged the seasons, resulting in 14 episodes in season 1, 28 episodes in season 2 (which includes the first third of the original season 3), and 24 episodes in season 3.

Season 1 (2011)

Season 2 (2012)

Season 3 (2013)

International broadcasts
In France, the series premiered on Téva on 1 June 2012 and on M6 on 4 July 2012. In Russia, it started airing on Domashny on 11 June 2012. The rights to broadcast Grand Hotel were acquired in the United Kingdom by Sky Arts. The series has also been sold to Turkey (Sinema TV Aşk), Lithuania (LNK), Estonia (Sony Entertainment Estonia and Kanal 11) and Venezuela (Televen). In Germany, the rights were acquired by Sony Entertainment Television  and on the free-TV-channel Disney Channel. In Poland the series started on 12 November 2013 by AXN White in its dubbed in Polish. In Slovakia, broadcasting by RTVS TV canal, started on the 7th of January 2014. In Serbia, it started airing on RTS 2 on 10 March 2015. In Bulgaria the series started on 5 June 2015 on Nova Television.

In the United States, Grand Hotel premiered on VmeTV on 31 October 2013 in its original language. As of August 2020, episodes can be streamed on Netflix with English dubbed. 

In Greece, the series was broadcast in 2016 by Alpha TV.

In Iran, the series was dubbed in Persian language and broadcast by GEM TV.

Ratings 
On IMDb the series received a favourable 8.4 rating. 
 

| link2             = #Season 2 (2012)
| episodes2         = 8
| start2            =  
| end2              = 
| startrating2         = 2.82
| endrating2           = 2.94
| viewers2          = |2}} 

| link3             = #Season 3 (2013)
| episodes3         = 22
| start3            =  
| end3              = 
| startrating3         = 2.62
| endrating3           = 2.62
| viewers3          = |2}} 
}}

International remakes
There have been several international remakes and adaptations of Gran Hotel:

 Italy's Rai 1 premiered an adaptation directed by Luca Ribuoli on 1 September 2015. The Italian version was re-titled in German-speaking countries as Hotel Imperial when it was broadcast by Servus TV on 29 July 2016. The Italian version consists of six episodes of two hours each, whereas the German broadcast has been divided into twelve one hour episodes. 
 Mexican network Televisa produced an adaptation, El hotel de los secretos (The Hotel of Secrets), that premiered on Las Estrellas channel in January 2016. 
 Egypt's CBC produced a popular Arabic market adaptation of Grand Hotel as a musalsal in 2016 which received critical acclaim and several awards. Netflix released the Egyptian version, under the title Secret of the Nile and with English, French, German, Italian and Spanish dubbed, on 15 March 2018. It is the first Egyptian series to air on Netflix. 
 In the United States, ABC premiered an adaptation called Grand Hotel, set in Miami in the present day, on 17 June 2019. It was cancelled in October 2019 after one season.
In France, TF1 produced and premiered an adaptation called Grand Hôtel, set on the French Riviera in the present day, on 3 September 2020. It was cancelled in December 2020 after only one season.

References

External links
 
 

Antena 3 (Spanish TV channel) network series
Television shows set in Spain
2011 Spanish television series debuts
2013 Spanish television series endings
2010s Spanish drama television series
Television series set in the 1900s
Historical television series
Television shows filmed in Spain
Television series set in hotels